Sabine River may refer to:

Sabine River (Texas–Louisiana), USA
Sabine River (New Zealand)